Good Hope is a locality in the Southern Tablelands of New South Wales, Australia in the Yass Valley Shire. It lies south-west of Yass on the northern side of Lake Burrinjuck on the Murrumbidgee River and south of the Yass River.

References

Localities in New South Wales
Yass Valley Council
Southern Tablelands